Buckley Island is an island-like mountain massif, surmounted by the peaks of Mount Bartlett, Mount Buckley and Mount Bowers, rising above the ice at the middle of the head of Beardmore Glacier in Antarctica. It was discovered by the British Antarctic Expedition (1907-09) and named in association with Mount Buckley, 2,645 m, its highest peak.

References

Mountains of Antarctica